The Shinhan Donghae Open is a men's professional golf tournament that has been held annually in South Korea since 1981. It has been an Asian Tour event since 2016. And it became the first event to be tri-sanctioned by the Asian Tour, Korean PGA and Japan Golf Tour from 2019. The tournament is sponsored by the Shinhan Financial Group which is a South Korean financial holding company.

Winners

Source:

Notes

References

External links
 
Coverage on the Asian Tour's official site
Coverage on the Japan Golf Tour's official site

Korean Tour events
Asian Tour events
Japan Golf Tour events
Golf tournaments in South Korea
Recurring sporting events established in 1981
1981 establishments in South Korea
Autumn events in South Korea